This is a list of rural localities in Zabaykalsky Krai. Zabaykalsky Krai (lit. Transbaikal krai) is a federal subject of Russia (a krai) that was created on March 1, 2008 as a result of a merger of Chita Oblast and Agin-Buryat Autonomous Okrug, after a referendum held on the issue on March 11, 2007. The administrative center of the krai is located in the city of Chita. As of the 2010 Census, the population was 1,107,107.

Akshinsky District 
Rural localities in Akshinsky District:

 Aksha

Alexandrovo-Zavodsky District 
Rural localities in Alexandrovo-Zavodsky District:

 Alexandrovsky Zavod

Chitinsky District 
Rural localities in Chitinsky District:

 Arakhley
 Avdey

Duldurginsky District 
Rural localities in Duldurginsky District:

 Duldurga

Gazimuro-Zavodsky District 
Rural localities in Gazimuro-Zavodsky District:

 Gazimursky Zavod

Kalarsky District 
Rural localities in Kalarsky District:

 Chara

Kalgansky District 
Rural localities in Kalgansky District:

 Kalga

Khiloksky District 
Rural localities in Khiloksky District:

 Bada
 Duty
 Glinka
 Gyrshelun
 Linyovo Ozero
 Mukhor-Shibirka

Krasnochikoysky District 
Rural localities in Krasnochikoysky District:

 Krasny Chikoy

Kyrinsky District 
Rural localities in Kyrinsky District:

 Kyra

Mogzon, Khiloksky District 
Rural localities in Mogzon, Khiloksky District:

 Zagarino

Nerchinsko-Zavodsky District 
Rural localities in Nerchinsko-Zavodsky District:

 Nerchinsky Zavod

Ononsky District 
Rural localities in Ononsky District:

 Nizhny Tsasuchey

Shelopuginsky District 
Rural localities in Shelopuginsky District:

 Shelopugino

Tungiro-Olyokminsky District 
Rural localities in Tungiro-Olyokminsky District:

 Tupik

Tungokochensky District 
Rural localities in Tungokochensky District:

 Verkh-Usugli

Ulyotovsky District 
Rural localities in Ulyotovsky District:

 Ulyoty

Zabaykalsky District 
Rural localities in Zabaykalsky District:

 Abagaytuy
 Dauriya

See also 
 
 Lists of rural localities in Russia

References 

Zabaykalsky Krai